Ibthorpe is a village in Hampshire, England.  Ibthorpe is in the civil parish of Hurstbourne Tarrant.

Name 
Ibthorpe is named after "Ibbaprop" which means, "Ibba's second settlement".

The Hamlet 
Most houses are situated around a central horseshoe-shaped road, with some extending toward neighbouring Hurstbourne Tarrant.

References

External links

Villages in Hampshire